Kálmán Tóth (born 13 August 1944) is a Hungarian footballer. He competed in the men's tournament at the 1972 Summer Olympics.

References

External links
 

1944 births
Living people
Hungarian footballers
Hungary international footballers
Olympic footballers of Hungary
Footballers at the 1972 Summer Olympics
Sportspeople from Szombathely
Association football forwards
Olympic silver medalists for Hungary
Olympic medalists in football
Medalists at the 1972 Summer Olympics
Integrál-DAC footballers
Budapest Honvéd FC players
FC Tatabánya players
Budafoki LC footballers